Valence or valency may refer to:

Science
 Valence (chemistry), a measure of an element's combining power with other atoms
 Degree (graph theory), also called the valency of a vertex in graph theory
 Valency (linguistics), aspect of verbs relative to other parts of speech  
 Valence (psychology) or hedonic tone, the (emotional) value associated with an event, object or situation

Places

France
 Valence, Charente, a commune in the Charente department
 Valence, Drôme, Drôme, a commune and prefecture of the Drôme department
 University of Valence, a medieval university
 Valence, Tarn-et-Garonne, a commune in the Tarn-et-Garonne department
 Canton of Valence, Tarn-et-Garonne department
 Arrondissement of Valence, Drôme department
 Roman Catholic Diocese of Valence
 Valence-d'Albigeois, in the Tarn department
 Valence-en-Brie, in the Seine-et-Marne department
 Valence-sur-Baïse, in the Gers department
 Bourg-lès-Valence, in the Drôme department

England
 River Valency, Cornwall
 Valence House, London

Spain
The French-language name for the city of Valencia, Spain

People
 Amasio Valence (born 1979), Fijian rugby union player
 Maurice Valency (1903–1996), American playwright, author, critic and professor
 Aymer de Valence (bishop) (c. 1220–1260), bishop of Winchester
 William de Valence, 1st Earl of Pembroke (1225–1296), French nobleman who played an important role in English politics
 Valence Mendis (born 1958), fourth bishop of Chilaw

Other uses
 Valence Technology, an American battery manufacturer

See also
 Valance (disambiguation)
 Valencia (disambiguation)
 Valença (disambiguation)
 Valentia (disambiguation)
 Valenza (disambiguation)
 Polyvalence (disambiguation)